The 1955–56 AHL season was the 20th season of the American Hockey League. Six teams played 64 games each in the schedule. The Providence Reds finished first overall in the regular season, and won their fourth Calder Cup championship.

Final standings
Note: GP = Games played; W = Wins; L = Losses; T = Ties; GF = Goals for; GA = Goals against; Pts = Points;

Scoring leaders

Note: GP = Games played; G = Goals; A = Assists; Pts = Points; PIM = Penalty minutes

 complete list

Calder Cup playoffs
First round
Providence Reds defeated Buffalo Bisons 3 games to 2.
Cleveland Barons defeated Pittsburgh Hornets 3 games to 1.
Finals
Providence Reds defeated Cleveland Barons 4 games to 0, to win the Calder Cup. 
 list of scores

All Star Classic
The 3rd AHL All-Star game was played on January 10, 1956, at the Duquesne Gardens in Pittsburgh, Pennsylvania. The defending Calder Cup champions Pittsburgh Hornets tied 4-4 with the AHL All-Stars.

Trophy and Award winners
Team Awards

Individual Awards

See also
List of AHL seasons

References
AHL official site
AHL Hall of Fame
HockeyDB

American Hockey League seasons
2